Tommy Suitts (born November 30, 1947) is an American college basketball coach. He was the head coach at Rice University from 1981 to 1987 and at Chicago State University from 1987 to 1990.

References

1947 births
Living people
American men's basketball players
Alabama Crimson Tide men's basketball players
American men's basketball coaches
Rice Owls men's basketball coaches
Chicago State Cougars men's basketball coaches
Southeast Missouri State Redhawks men's basketball coaches